Axone may refer to:
Axone (film), 2019 film
Axone (arena), sports arena in Montbéliard, France
Akhuni, a fermented Indian soybean product

See also 
 Axon (disambiguation)